"Girls Who Play Guitars" is the third single from Our Earthly Pleasures, the second album from the band Maxïmo Park. The single was released on 20 August 2007.

Track listing
CD
 "Girls Who Play Guitars" (Radio Edit)
 "An Unknown"
 "Sandblasted and Set Free" (Original Instrumental Demo)

7" 1 (White Vinyl)
 "Girls Who Play Guitars"
 "Warehouse"

7" 2 (Yellow Vinyl)
 "Girls Who Play Guitars" (Original Demo Version)
 "Girls Who Play Guitars" (Radio Edit)
 "(I Remember) Joe Brainard"

Digital exclusive 1 (Recordstore Bundle Only)
 "Girls Who Play Guitars" (Live Version)

Digital exclusive 2 (Recordstore Bundle Only)
 "Girls Who Play Guitars" (Acoustic Version)
The two digital exclusives will only be available until the single is released.

Chart positions

In popular culture
This song was made available for download in the video game Rock Band on 12 June 2008.

References

External links
Maxïmo Park Website

2007 singles
Maxïmo Park songs
Songs written by Paul Smith (rock vocalist)
Songs written by Duncan Lloyd
2007 songs
Song recordings produced by Gil Norton
Warp (record label) singles